Sheikh Pir Nasiruddin Abul Hakayik Pir Mahmud bin Ahmed Ahi Evran bin Abbas Veli al-Khoyi (1169–1261), commonly known as Ahi Evran or Pir Ahi Evren-ı Veli, was a Turkic Alevi Sufi saint, preacher, philosopher, poet, and the leader of the Ahi Brotherhood.

Life 
Born in Khoy in 1169, he grew up in Azerbaijan, moved to Kayseri, Turkey and established the Ahi guild there. He was a Bektashi preacher who had gone to Trabzon during the Empire of Trebizond to spread Islam.   

He was killed by Mongols in Kırşehir on 1 April 1261. His grave site is in debate, but thought to be in Boztepe. The site is near Trabzon. It is considered as sacred and has been visited by many people. This grave, however, may instead be that of a clan leader or a Greek metropolitan who had accepted Islam. According to Sakir Sevket, in 1863, Muslim preacher Sheykh Haji Hakki Efendi was inspired to build a place near Ahi Evren's grave. So when Sheykh Haji Hakki Efendi died in 1890, he was buried there. The government then built a tomb and mosque at the site.

Legacy 

A new insect species discovered in Turkey by assistant professor Mahmut Erbey at Ahi Evran University was named Evrani to honor the university and the saint.

See also 

 Ahi Evran in Turkish

References

External links
 Ahilik ve Yaran

Sources

1169 births
1261 deaths
Islamic philosophers